Triteleia lemmoniae, common names Oak Creek triteleia, Lemmon's star or Oak Creek triplet lily,  is a plant species now classed in the family Asparagaceae, although older classifications would have regarded it part of the Liliaceae.

Triteleia lemmoniae is endemic to Arizona, the only member of the genus native to the state.

The species is named for Sara Plummer Lemmon (1836–1923), a well-known American botanist. She and her husband, John Gill (J.G.) Lemmon, lived and worked in Oakland, California but did extensive botanical explorations in Arizona. Several species bear the epithet "lemmonii" in his honor; Triteleia lemmoniae and Mount Lemmon in Arizona were named in hers.

References

External links
Southwest Environmental Information Network, Triteleia lemmoniae
Arizona Wild Flowers Pictures, Photos, Images Descriptions, Information, Reviews. Lemmon's Star, Triteleia lemmonae

lemmoniae
Flora of Arizona
Endemic flora of the United States
Plants described in 1885
Flora without expected TNC conservation status